Israel Maurice Edelman (2 March 1911 – 14 December 1975) was a Wales-born British Labour Party politician and novelist who represented Coventry constituencies in the House of Commons for over 30 years.

Early life 

Maurice Edelman was born in Cardiff in 1911. His parents came to Wales in 1905, escaping the pogroms in Tsarist Russia. His father was a photographer. He was educated at Cardiff High School and Trinity College, Cambridge, where he was an Exhibitioner in Modern Languages (French, German and later Russian).  He joined the plywood industry in 1931 as a company director and at the outbreak of the Second World War was engaged in research into the application of plywood and plastic materials to aircraft construction.

Writing career 

Edelman was a prolific journalist and author of several works of fiction and non-fiction. His novels include A Trial of Love (1951), Who Goes Home? (1953), A Dream of Treason (1954), The Happy Ones (1957), A Call on Kuprim (1959), The Minister (1961), The Fratricides (1963), The Prime Minister's Daughter (1964), All on a Summer's Night (1969), Disraeli In Love (1972) and Disraeli Rising (1975).

His non-fiction works include France: The Birth of the Fourth Republic, and a biography of David Ben Gurion.  He also produced screenplays for television broadcasts during the 1960s and 1970s. During the Second World War he worked for Picture Post as a war correspondent in North Africa and Italy.

Political career 

At the 1945 election Edelman was elected as Member of Parliament (MP) for Coventry West. In 1950 he won the new seat of Coventry North.

He was a vice-chairman of the British Council and chairman of the Franco-British Parliamentary Relations Committee. He was a founder member of the Council of Europe in 1949.  A lifelong Francophile, Edelman was appointed Officier de la Légion d'Honneur in 1960, having previously been awarded Chevalier de la Légion d'Honneur in 1954.

Following further boundary changes in 1974, Edelman represented Coventry North West until his death. His successor was Geoffrey Robinson, who won a by-election on 4 March 1976.

He appeared on the live television panel show What's My Line? from New York on 29 April 1962.

He was also president of the Anglo-Jewish Association, and an active member of the Friends of the Hebrew University.

He died on 14 December 1975 at the age of 64.

References 

 Dictionary of National Biography
 Who was Who

External links
 
Catalogue of Edelman's papers, held at the Modern Records Centre, University of Warwick

1911 births
1975 deaths
Writers from Cardiff
Jewish British politicians
Labour Party (UK) MPs for English constituencies
Politicians from Cardiff
British people of Polish-Jewish descent
Welsh Jews
UK MPs 1945–1950
UK MPs 1950–1951
UK MPs 1951–1955
UK MPs 1955–1959
UK MPs 1959–1964
UK MPs 1964–1966
UK MPs 1966–1970
UK MPs 1970–1974
UK MPs 1974
UK MPs 1974–1979